Abdülkadir Ömür (born 25 June 1999) is a Turkish footballer who plays as a central midfielder for Trabzonspor.

Club career

Early career
Born in Çarşıbaşı, Trabzon in 1999, Ömür was scouted by Trabzonspor scouting team and he got a chance to have trial matches. After that, Ömür joined the Trabzonspor youth team in 2011.

Trabzonspor
In 2016, Ömür was called up for the Trabzonspor first team. On 12 January 2016, Ömür made his senior team debut in the Turkish Cup against Adanaspor at Adana 5 Ocak Stadium, replacing Soner Aydoğdu in the 65th minute.

On 17 December 2016, he made his Süper Lig debut against İstanbul Başakşehir, replacing Serge Akakpo in the 82nd minute in a 0–1 loss.

On 22 December 2016, he scored his first senior goal in the Turkish Cup against Kızılcabölükspor at the 35th minute of a 5–0 win.

In January 2019, it was rumoured that Ömür had signed for English side Liverpool, however Liverpool denied making any offer for the player.

International career
Ömür earned his first call up for the Turkey senior team in March 2018 for a friendly against Republic of Ireland. He was an unused substitute as Turkey won 1–0. He made his debut on 30 May 2019, in a friendly against Greece, as a half-time substitute for Kenan Karaman.

Club career statistics

Honours
Trabzonspor
Turkish Cup: 2019–20
Süper Lig: 2021–22
Turkish Super Cup: 2022

References

External links
 

Living people
1999 births
Turkish footballers
Association football midfielders
Turkey youth international footballers
Turkey under-21 international footballers
Turkey international footballers
Trabzonspor footballers
Süper Lig players
People from Trabzon Province
UEFA Euro 2020 players